Ye' Win Aung (born 6 August 1993) is a footballer from Burma, and a defender for the Myanmar national football team and Yadanarbon FC. He appeared as a midfielder for silver medalist Myanmar U-23 Team in 2015 SEA Games and scored against the Philippines Team.

References

1993 births
Living people
Sportspeople from Yangon
Burmese footballers
Myanmar international footballers
Association football defenders
Yadanarbon F.C. players
Southeast Asian Games silver medalists for Myanmar
Southeast Asian Games medalists in football
Competitors at the 2015 Southeast Asian Games